Athens Township is one of the fifteen townships of Harrison County, Ohio, United States. As of the 2010 census the population was 505, of whom 185 lived in the unincorporated portion of the township.

Geography
Located in the southern part of the county, it borders the following townships:
Cadiz Township - north
Short Creek Township - east
Wheeling Township, Belmont County - southeast
Flushing Township, Belmont County - southwest
Moorefield Township - west

The village of New Athens is located in southeastern Athens Township.

Name and history
Statewide, the only other Athens Township is located in Athens County.

Government
The township is governed by a three-member board of trustees, who are elected in November of odd-numbered years to a four-year term beginning on the following January 1. Two are elected in the year after the presidential election and one is elected in the year before it. There is also an elected township fiscal officer, who serves a four-year term beginning on April 1 of the year after the election, which is held in November of the year before the presidential election. Vacancies in the fiscal officership or on the board of trustees are filled by the remaining trustees.

References

External links
County website

Townships in Harrison County, Ohio
Townships in Ohio